Gregory O'Kane (born 1972) is an Irish former hurler who is the current coach of the Antrim senior hurling team.

O'Kane made his first appearance as a player for the Antrim team during the 1991 championship and was a regular player in the forwards until his retirement following the conclusion of the 2005 championship. During that time he won eight Ulster winners' medals.

At club level O'Kane is a ten-time Ulster club winners' medalist with Dunloy. He has also won eleven county club championship winners' medals.

References

1972 births
Living people
Dunloy hurlers
Antrim inter-county hurlers
Ulster inter-provincial hurlers